Fagnampleu (also spelled Fényampleu) is a town in western Ivory Coast. It is a sub-prefecture of Man Department in Tonkpi Region, Montagnes District.

Fagnampleu was a commune until March 2012, when it became one of 1126 communes nationwide that were abolished.

In 2014, the population of the sub-prefecture of Fagnampleu was 2,967.

Villages
The four villages of the sub-prefecture of Fagnampleu and their population in 2014 are:
 Douagouin (458)
 Gangbapleu (373)
 Glayogouin (435)
 Fagnampleu (1 701)

Notes

Sub-prefectures of Tonkpi
Former communes of Ivory Coast